Badis siamensis is a species of freshwater ray-finned fish from the family found only in Thailand. This species grows to a length of 3.9 cm (1.5 in).

References

Fish of Thailand
Fish described in 1957
Badidae